Apostol Spiridonovich Kostanda (December 24, 1817 – December 5, 1898) was an Imperial Russian division commander. He fought in wars in Crimea and Poland. He commanded the military forces in Moscow from 1888 to 1896.

Awards
Order of Saint Anna, 2nd class, 1854
Order of Saint Vladimir, 4th class, 1854
Gold Sword for Bravery, 1854
Order of Saint Stanislaus (House of Romanov), 1st class, 1862
Order of Saint Anna, 1st class, 1868
Order of Saint Vladimir, 2nd class, 1870
Order of the White Eagle (Russian Empire), 1873
Order of Saint Alexander Nevsky, 1882
Order of St. Andrew, 1896
Order of Prince Danilo I

References

 
 Список генералам по старшинству на 1886 г. СПб., 1886
 

Russian military personnel of the Crimean War
Russian people of the January Uprising
Recipients of the Order of St. Anna, 2nd class
Recipients of the Order of St. Vladimir, 4th class
Recipients of the Gold Sword for Bravery
Recipients of the Order of Saint Stanislaus (Russian), 1st class
Recipients of the Order of St. Anna, 1st class
Recipients of the Order of St. Vladimir, 2nd class
Recipients of the Order of the White Eagle (Russia)
1817 births
1898 deaths
Burials at Tikhvin Cemetery